This is a list of different types of revenue stamps with a list of countries that used each type.

Additional Stock
South Africa, 1913-1935 - Revenue stamps of South Africa

Admiralty Court
Great Britain and Ireland, 1855-1858 - Revenue stamps of the United Kingdom
Ireland, 1858-1881 - Revenue stamps of Ireland

Agreement
India, 1914-c.1980 - Revenue stamps of India
including various states
Pakistan, c.1950 - Revenue stamps of Pakistan

Airport Tax
Bangladesh, 1982 - Revenue stamps of Bangladesh
Kenya, 1972-1993 - Revenue stamps of Kenya
Libya, c.1980-c.1985 - Revenue stamps of Libya
Malta, 1975-1988 - Revenue stamps of Malta
Nepal - Revenue stamps of Nepal
Southern Yemen, c.1970 - Revenue stamps of Yemen
Sudan, c.1998 - Revenue stamps of Sudan
Syria, 1970s-2000 - Revenue stamps of Syria
Tanzania, 1987-1993 - Revenue stamps of Tanzania
Uganda, c.1990 - Revenue stamps of Uganda
Yemen, 1971-1980s - Revenue stamps of Yemen
Zanzibar, c.1993-c.1994 - Revenue stamps of Zanzibar
Zimbabwe, 1987-1994 - Revenue stamps of Zimbabwe

Amusements Tax
Alberta - Revenue stamps of Canada

Animal Slaughter
Ireland, c.1930 - Revenue stamps of Ireland

Annuity Premium
Great Britain and Ireland, 1893 - Revenue stamps of the United Kingdom

Applications
Malta, 1925 - Revenue stamps of Malta

Arms Licence
Baluchistan, 1973–present - Revenue stamps of Pakistan
North West Frontier Province, 1974–present - Revenue stamps of Pakistan
Punjab, 1974–present - Revenue stamps of India
Sindh, 1974–present - Revenue stamps of Pakistan
West Pakistan, c.1950-1970 - Revenue stamps of Pakistan

Assize
South Africa, c.1920-1956 - Revenue stamps of South Africa

Assurance License
Quebec, 1876 - Revenue stamps of Canada

Attestation
Pakistan, c.1960 - Revenue stamps of Pakistan

Authorities
Kuwait, c.1990 - Revenue stamps of Kuwait

Avocado Levy
Queensland, 1946-1951 - Revenue stamps of Queensland

Bailiff Fee

Basel-City, Switzerland, 1897-1944 - Revenue stamps of Basel
South Australia, 1982-1990 - Revenue stamps of South Australia

Banana Levy
Queensland, 1936-1951 - Revenue stamps of Queensland

Bank Draft
Orange Free State (Orange River Colony), 1891-1900 - Revenue stamps of South Africa

Bankruptcy
Great Britain and Northern Ireland, 1869-1959 - Revenue stamps of the United Kingdom
Ireland, 1873-1935 - Revenue stamps of Ireland
Northern Ireland, 1921-1971 - Revenue stamps of the United Kingdom
Quebec, 1924-1969 - Revenue stamps of Canada

Bean Levy
Queensland, 1954-1957 - Revenue stamps of Queensland

Beer Duty
Australia, 1920-1948 - Revenue stamps of Australia
New South Wales, c.1887-1903 - Revenue stamps of New South Wales
New Zealand, 1878-1908 - Revenue stamps of New Zealand
Newfoundland, 1938 - Revenue stamps of Canada
Queensland, 1885-c.1914 - Revenue stamps of Queensland
South Australia, 1894-1918 - Revenue stamps of South Australia
Tasmania, 1880-1918 - Revenue stamps of Tasmania
Victoria, 1880-1906 - Revenue stamps of Victoria
Western Australia, 1901-1906 - Revenue stamps of Western Australia

Beetroot Sugar Association
Liverpool, c.1890-1899 - Revenue stamps of the United Kingdom

Bicycle Control
Basel-City, Switzerland, 1944-1975 - Revenue stamps of Basel

Bill of Exchange / Bill Stamp

Basel-City, Switzerland, 1870-1883 - Revenue stamps of Basel
Canada, 1864-1868 - Revenue stamps of Canada
Hong Kong, 1907-1972 - Revenue stamps of Hong Kong
Italian East Africa, 1946
Mauritius, 1869-1904 - Revenue stamps of Mauritius
Nova Scotia, 1869 - Revenue stamps of Canada
Seychelles, 1897 - Revenue stamps of Seychelles

Bill and Receipt
Jammu and Kashmir, c.1957-1964 - Revenue stamps of Pakistan

Board of Agriculture
Great Britain and Ireland, 1889 - Revenue stamps of the United Kingdom

Bordereau
Basel-City, Switzerland, 1884-1916 - Revenue stamps of Basel

Broker's Note
India, 1910-c.1980 - Revenue stamps of India
including various states
Myanmar, c.2000 - Revenue stamps of Myanmar
Pakistan, c.1950 - Revenue stamps of Pakistan

Buffalo Fly Control
Queensland, 1941-1966 - Revenue stamps of Queensland
Tanganyika, c.1950 - Revenue stamps of Tanganyika

Building Fund
Manitoba, 1886-1887 - Revenue stamps of Canada

Cattle Duty
New South Wales, 1951-c.1980 - Revenue stamps of New South Wales
South Australia, 1940-1966 - Revenue stamps of South Australia
Victoria, 1927-c.2000 - Revenue stamps of Victoria
Western Australia, 1964 - Revenue stamps of Western Australia

Central Recruitment Fee
India, c.1985-2000 - Revenue stamps of India

Certificate of Identity
Great Britain and Northern Ireland, c.1933Revenue stamps of the United Kingdom

Chamber of Commerce
Basel-City, Switzerland, 1951 - Revenue stamps of Basel

Chancellery

Bern-City, Switzerland, 1930 - Revenue stamps of Bern

Chancery Fee Fund / Chancery Court
Great Britain and Ireland, 1852-1875 - Revenue stamps of the United Kingdom
Ireland, 1867-1868 - Revenue stamps of Ireland
Lancashire, 1875-1971 - Revenue stamps of the United Kingdom

Charity Tax
Southern Yemen, 1969 - Revenue stamps of Yemen

Children's Allowance
Ireland, c.1975 - Revenue stamps of Ireland

Chocolate Duty
Great Britain, 1743 (no surviving examples) - Revenue stamps of the United Kingdom

Cigarette Tax

Bangladesh, c.1972-c.1975 - Revenue stamps of Bangladesh
British South Africa Company (Rhodesia), c.1905 - Revenue stamps of Rhodesia
Cape of Good Hope, 1909 - Revenue stamps of the Cape of Good Hope
Kenya, Uganda and Tanganyika, c.1940s-1950s - Revenue stamps of Kenya,  - Revenue stamps of Uganda
Malta, c.1930-c.2006 - Revenue stamps of Malta
Newfoundland, 1907 - Revenue stamps of Canada
Northern Rhodesia, c.1930-c.1935 - Revenue stamps of Rhodesia
Rhodesia and Nyasaland, c.1955 - Revenue stamps of Rhodesia
South Africa, 1910-c.1980 - Revenue stamps of Rhodesia
South West Africa, 1931-1937 - Revenue stamps of South Africa
Southern Rhodesia, c.1930 - Revenue stamps of Rhodesia

Circuit Court
Ireland, 1927-1977 - Revenue stamps of Ireland

Citrus Levy
Queensland, 1936-1951 - Revenue stamps of Queensland

Civil Aviation
India, c.1960 - Revenue stamps of India

Civil Service
Great Britain and Northern Ireland, 1870-1947 - Revenue stamps of the United Kingdom
Ireland, 1922 - Revenue stamps of Ireland
Northern Ireland, 1921-1950-Revenue stamps of the United Kingdom
Southern Ireland, 1921 - Revenue stamps of Ireland

Civil War Victims
Sudan, 1998-c.2000 - Revenue stamps of Sudan

Cocoa
Great Britain and Ireland, 1822 - Revenue stamps of the United Kingdom

Coffee
Great Britain and Ireland, 1882-1924 - Revenue stamps of the United Kingdom
Jamaica, 1950s-1970s - Revenue stamps of Jamaica

Colonial Office Services
Great Britain and Ireland, 1900 - Revenue stamps of the United Kingdom

Commercial Tax
Sudan, c.2000 - Revenue stamps of Sudan

Commercial Transactions Levy
Uganda, 1973 - Revenue stamps of Uganda

Commissioners' Adjudication
Queensland, 1895 - Revenue stamps of Queensland

Common Law Courts
Great Britain and Ireland, 1865-1866 - Revenue stamps of the United Kingdom

Companies Registration
Great Britain and Northern Ireland, 1867-1959 - Revenue stamps of the United Kingdom
Ireland, 1922-1971 - Revenue stamps of Ireland
Northern Ireland, 1921 - Revenue stamps of the United Kingdom
Southern Ireland, 1921 - Revenue stamps of Ireland

Companies Winding Up
Great Britain and Northern Ireland, 1891-1959 - Revenue stamps of the United Kingdom

Consolidated Fund
Canada, 1864 - Revenue stamps of Canada
Manitoba, 1877-1885 - Revenue stamps of Canada

Consular Service
British Central Africa, 1898-c.1906 - Revenue stamps of Nyasaland and Malawi
British East Africa, 1897 - Revenue stamps of Kenya
Ceylon, 1954 - Revenue stamps of Sri Lanka
Great Britain and Northern Ireland, 1885-1947 - Revenue stamps of the United Kingdom
India, c.1910-1975 - Revenue stamps of India
Ireland, 1931-1971 - Revenue stamps of Ireland
Kuwait, 1968 - Revenue stamps of Kuwait
Libya, 1955-1986 - Revenue stamps of Libya
Niger Coast, 1898 - Revenue stamps of Nigeria
Nyasaland, 1913 - Revenue stamps of Nyasaland and Malawi
Palestine, c.1920 - Revenue stamps of Palestine
South Africa, 1913-1980 - Revenue stamps of South Africa
Southern Nigeria, 1902 - Revenue stamps of Nigeria
Syria, 1947-2002 - Revenue stamps of Syria
Uganda, c.1896-c.1898 - Revenue stamps of Uganda
Yemen, 1940s-2012 - Revenue stamps of Yemen

Contracts / Contract Note

Great Britain and Northern Ireland, 1888-1983 - Revenue stamps of the United Kingdom
Hong Kong, c.1945-1972 - Revenue stamps of Hong Kong
Ireland, 1922-1943 - Revenue stamps of Ireland
Malta, 1925-1926 - Revenue stamps of Malta
Northern Ireland, c.1910-1971 - Revenue stamps of the United Kingdom
Southern Ireland, 1921 - Revenue stamps of Ireland

Contributory Pensions Insurance
Bermuda, 1980-c.1984 - Revenue stamps of Bermuda

Copyhold &c Commission
Great Britain and Ireland, 1868-1881 - Revenue stamps of the United Kingdom

Corn Trade
Hull, c.1873-c.1897 - Revenue stamps of the United Kingdom
Liverpool, c.1886-c.1972 - Revenue stamps of the United Kingdom

Corporate Affairs Commission
New South Wales, 1966 - Revenue stamps of New South Wales

Cotton Association
Liverpool, 1875-1971 - Revenue stamps of the United Kingdom

Counterpart
New Zealand, 1870-1939 - Revenue stamps of New Zealand

County Courts
Ireland, 1878-1922 - Revenue stamps of Ireland
Northern Ireland, 1921-1971 - Revenue stamps of the United Kingdom
Southern Ireland, 1922 - Revenue stamps of Ireland

Court Fee

Aden, 1937 - Revenue stamps of Aden
Bangladesh, 1973-1992 - Revenue stamps of Bangladesh
British Somaliland, 1900-1904
Burma, 1936-c.1989 - Revenue stamps of Myanmar
Egyptian Expeditionary Force, 1918-1919
Federated Shan States, c.1930
India, 1870-1872 - Revenue stamps of India
including various states
Iraq, 1915 - Revenue stamps of Iraq
Myanmar, c.1989-2006 - Revenue stamps of Myanmar
Pakistan, 1948-c.1990 - Revenue stamps of Pakistan
Palestine, 1919-1920 - Revenue stamps of Palestine
Portuguese India, c.1962 - Revenue stamps of India
South Australia, 1982-1990 - Revenue stamps of South Australia
Southampton, 1878 - Revenue stamps of the United Kingdom
Trucial States, 1948-1962 - Revenue stamps of the United Arab Emirates
West Pakistan, 1947 - Revenue stamps of Pakistan

Court Fee Copies
India, c.1930-1967 - Revenue stamps of India

Court Fee Service
India, 1870-1875 - Revenue stamps of India

Court House
Sheffield, c.1892 - Revenue stamps of the United Kingdom

Court of Justice
Ireland, c.1960 - Revenue stamps of Ireland

Custodian's Fee
India, 1937-1948 - Revenue stamps of India

Customs Duty

Australia, 1907-1958 - Revenue stamps of Australia
Canada, 1912-1935 - Revenue stamps of Canada
Cape of Good Hope, 1902 - Revenue stamps of the Cape of Good Hope
Great Britain and Ireland, 1860-1904 - Revenue stamps of the United Kingdom
India, 1865 and 1957-c.1964 - Revenue stamps of India
Ireland, 1925-1941 - Revenue stamps of Ireland
Natal, 1903-1905 - Revenue stamps of South Africa
Newfoundland, 1925-1938 - Revenue stamps of Canada
Orange River Colony, c.1906-1912 - Revenue stamps of South Africa
Sarawak, 1900-c.1924 - Revenue stamps of Sarawak
South Africa, 1913-1954 - Revenue stamps of South Africa
Transvaal, 1908 - Revenue stamps of Transvaal

Customs Entry Duty
Ireland, 1924-c.1954 - Revenue stamps of Ireland

Customs Frank Fee
South African Republic, 1893-1894 - Revenue stamps of Transvaal

Customs Late Fee
Ireland, c.1960 - Revenue stamps of Ireland

Defence
Yemen, c.1956 - Revenue stamps of Yemen

Denoting
New Zealand, c.1920-1939 - Revenue stamps of New Zealand

Departure Tax
Australia, 1978-1990 - Revenue stamps of Australia
Papua New Guinea, 1994-c.1995
Turks and Caicos Islands, 1988-1998

Design
Great Britain and Ireland, 1907 - Revenue stamps of the United Kingdom

Devair
Egyptian Expeditionary Force, 1918

Development Tax
Queensland, 1938-1941 - Revenue stamps of Queensland

Diplomatic Service
Great Britain and Northern Ireland, 1964 - Revenue stamps of the United Kingdom

Direct Court of Justice
Ireland, c.1925-1977 - Revenue stamps of Ireland

Displaced Persons
Pakistan, c.1950-c.1961 - Revenue stamps of Pakistan

District Audit
Great Britain and Northern Ireland, 1879-c.1973 - Revenue stamps of the United Kingdom

Dog Licence
Ireland, 1865-1921 - Revenue stamps of Ireland
Northern Ireland, 1921 - Revenue stamps of the United Kingdom
Southern Ireland, 1921 - Revenue stamps of Ireland

Dog Licence Registration

Ireland, 1893-1922 - Revenue stamps of Ireland
Northern Ireland, 1922-1983 - Revenue stamps of the United Kingdom

Driving Licence
Baluchistan, 2010–present - Revenue stamps of Pakistan
North West Frontier Province, 1985–present - Revenue stamps of Pakistan
Punjab, 1976–present - Revenue stamps of Pakistan
Sindh, 1971–present - Revenue stamps of Pakistan
West Pakistan, 1970 - Revenue stamps of Pakistan

Drought Relief
Rajasthan, c.1990

Education
Myanmar, 1995-c.2010 - Revenue stamps of Myanmar

Egg Stabilisation Charge
Western Australia, 1940 - Revenue stamps of Western Australia

Electric Light Inspection

Canada, 1895-1903 - Revenue stamps of Canada

Electricity and Gas Inspection

Canada, 1930 - Revenue stamps of Canada

Employment
Basel-City, Switzerland, 1922-1956 - Revenue stamps of Basel
New Zealand, 1937-1939 - Revenue stamps of New Zealand
Northern Rhodesia, c.1962 - Revenue stamps of Rhodesia
Nyasaland, c.1962 - Revenue stamps of Nyasaland and Malawi

Entertainments Tax
Assam, c.1957 - Revenue stamps of India
Australia, c.1946 - Revenue stamps of Australia
Bangladesh, c.1972-1983 - Revenue stamps of Bangladesh
Bengal, 1921-1922
Bombay, c.1920-c.1957 - Revenue stamps of India
Cape Province, c.1940-1961 - Revenue stamps of Cape of Good Hope
Delhi, c.1948-c.1964 - Revenue stamps of India
Federated Malay States, c.1930 - Revenue stamps of Mayalsia
Guernsey, 1919 - Revenue stamps of Guernsey
Haryana, c.1964
Jaipur, c.1957-c.1964
Madhya Pradesh, c.1957-c.1964
Mysore, 1957-c.1965 - Revenue stamps of India
Natal, c.1918-c.1965
Orange Free State, c.1915-c.1920
Pakistan, c.1965-c.1972 - Revenue stamps of Pakistan
Punjab, c.1948-c.1964 - Revenue stamps of Pakistan
Rajasthan, c.1957-c.1964
Singapore, 1955-c.1976 - Revenue stamps of Singapore
South West Africa, 1931-c.1961 - Revenue stamps of South Africa
Straits Settlements, c.1930 - Revenue stamps of Malaysia
Sudan, c.1968-c.1974 - Revenue stamps of Sudan
Tanzania, c.1963-1990
Transvaal, c.1940-c.1950
United Provinces, c.1930-c.1948
West Bengal, c.1950-c.1975 - Revenue stamps of India

Estate Duty
Great Britain and Northern Ireland, 1895-1948 - Revenue stamps of the United Kingdom
Ireland, 1922-1925 - Revenue stamps of Ireland
New Zealand, 1868 - Revenue stamps of New Zealand
Northern Ireland, 1921 - Revenue stamps of the United Kingdom
Southern Ireland, 1921 - Revenue stamps of Ireland

Excise
Bangladesh, 1981-1986 - Revenue stamps of Bangladesh
Canada, 1915-1948 - Revenue stamps of Canada
Great Britain and Northern Ireland, 1916-1957 - Revenue stamps of the United Kingdom
India, c.1937-c.1980 - Revenue stamps of India
Ireland, 1922-1980 - Revenue stamps of Ireland
Northern Ireland, 1921-c.1936 - Revenue stamps of the United Kingdom
Pakistan, c.1958-c.1990 - Revenue stamps of Pakistan
Southern Rhodesia, c.1942-c.1945 - Revenue stamps of Rhodesia

Exit Fee
Syria, 1970s - Revenue stamps of Syria

External Affairs
Canada, 1949 - Revenue stamps of Canada

Family Endowment
New South Wales, 1932 - Revenue stamps of New South Wales

Farm Dairy Butter Levy
South Africa, c.1930 - Revenue stamps of South Africa

Fee
Leeward Islands, 1882-1918
Quebec, 1924-1969 - Revenue stamps of Canada
Trinidad, 1887-c.1890 - Revenue stamps of Trinidad and Tobago

Free Fee
Trinidad, 1887-1890 - Revenue stamps of Trinidad and Tobago

Film Censorship
Ireland, 1925-1971 - Revenue stamps of Ireland

Financial Emergency Tax
Western Australia, 1932 - Revenue stamps of Western Australia

Fine
New Zealand, 1867-1947 - Revenue stamps of New Zealand

Fine or Fee
Southton, 1880 - Revenue stamps of the United Kingdom

Fixed Fee
Canton of Bern, Switzerland, 1878-1940s - Revenue stamps of Bern
Iraq, 1917 - Revenue stamps of Iraq

Foreign Bill

Bangladesh, 1978-c.1990 - Revenue stamps of Bangladesh
Burma, 1937-c.1953 - Revenue stamps of Myanmar
Ceylon, 1862-1909 - Revenue stamps of Sri Lanka
Great Britain and Northern Ireland, 1854-1959 - Revenue stamps of the United Kingdom
India, 1860-c.1980 - Revenue stamps of India
including various states
Iraq, 1915 - Revenue stamps of Iraq
Ireland, 1922-1951 - Revenue stamps of Ireland
Northern Ireland, 1921-1960 - Revenue stamps of the United Kingdom
Pakistan, 1947-c.1992 - Revenue stamps of Pakistan
Southern Ireland, 1921 - Revenue stamps of Ireland
Straits Settlements, 1869 - Revenue stamps of Malaysia

Foreign Office
Great Britain and Northern Ireland, 1923-1950 - Revenue stamps of the United Kingdom

Foreign Service
Great Britain and Northern Ireland, 1951-1959 - Revenue stamps of the United Kingdom

Foreign Trade Tax
Syria, 1970 - Revenue stamps of Syria

Foreign Travel Tax
India, 1979-c.2000 - Revenue stamps of India

Forest Department
India, c.1890-1891 - Revenue stamps of India

Forestry Fund
Northern Cyprus, 1995 - Revenue stamps of Northern Cyprus

Fruit Inspection Fee
New Zealand, c.1940 - Revenue stamps of New Zealand

Furniture Workers
Transvaal, c.1940 - Revenue stamps of Transvaal

Game Bird Habitat
New Zealand, 1994–present - Revenue stamps of New Zealand

Gas Inspection

Canada, 1875-1915 - Revenue stamps of Canada

Gasoline Tax
Ontario, 1928 - Revenue stamps of Canada

General Security
Syria, 1937-2007 - Revenue stamps of Syria

Glove Duty
Great Britain, 1785 - Revenue stamps of the United Kingdom

Government Savings Bank Duty
Western Australia, 1906 - Revenue stamps of Western Australia

Graded Tax
Swaziland, c.1970

Graduated Tax
Buganda, 1963
Kenya, 1963-c.1970 - Revenue stamps of Kenya
Malawi, 1970-1973 - Revenue stamps of Nyasaland and Malawi

Guildhall Consultation Fee
Great Britain and Ireland, 1892 - Revenue stamps of the United Kingdom

Hair Powder
Great Britain, 1786 - Revenue stamps of the United Kingdom

Harbour Due

Basel-City, Switzerland, 1934-1940s - Revenue stamps of Basel

Hat Tax
Great Britain and Ireland, 1784-1804 - Revenue stamps of the United Kingdom

Health and Pensions Insurance
Great Britain and Northern Ireland, 1925-1946 - Revenue stamps of the United Kingdom
Isle of Man, 1930 - Revenue stamps of the Isle of Man

Health Inspection Fees
Mogadishu, c.1952

Health Tax
Syria, 1954-1980s - Revenue stamps of Syria

Hejaz Railway
Egyptian Expeditionary Force, 1918-1919
Iraq, 1917 - Revenue stamps of Iraq
Emirate of Transjordan, 1920-1925

High Court
India, 1869-1870 - Revenue stamps of India

High Court Advocate
Burma, 1953 - Revenue stamps of Myanmar
India, c.1870-c.1937 - Revenue stamps of India
Myanmar, c.2000 - Revenue stamps of Myanmar

High Court Notarial
India, c.1890-c.1975 - Revenue stamps of India
Pakistan, c.1960 - Revenue stamps of Pakistan

High Court Service
India, 1870-1904 - Revenue stamps of India

Holiday Pay Credit
Alberta, 1953-c.1965 - Revenue stamps of Canada

Holiday and Sickness Benefits
Northern Cyprus, c.1970-c.2000 - Revenue stamps of Northern Cyprus

Honey Seal
New Zealand, 1938-1959 - Revenue stamps of New Zealand

Horse Duty
Great Britain and Ireland, 1779-1840 - Revenue stamps of the United Kingdom

Hospital Aid / Fund / Tax
British Columbia, 1933 - Revenue stamps of Canada
Kenya, 1966-2002 - Revenue stamps of Kenya
Orange Free State, 1900 - Revenue stamps of South Africa
Western Australia, 1930-1940 - Revenue stamps of Western Australia

House of Lords
Great Britain and Northern Ireland, 1902-1960 - Revenue stamps of the United Kingdom

Huduma Services Charge
Kenya, 1995-1996 - Revenue stamps of Kenya

Hunting Tax
British Columbia, 1946-1949 - Revenue stamps of Canada
Canada, 1985-2005 - Revenue stamps of Canada
Victoria, 1973-1982 - Revenue stamps of Victoria

Identification Card
Basel-City, Switzerland, 1931 - Revenue stamps of Basel
Pakistan, c.1990 - Revenue stamps of Pakistan

Immigration
Palestine, c.1920 - Revenue stamps of Palestine
Uganda, c.1946-1954 - Revenue stamps of Uganda

Immigration Clearance Fee
Australia, c.1980 - Revenue stamps of Australia

Immigration Passports
Southern Yemen, 1968-1981 - Revenue stamps of Yemen

Income Tax
Eastern Nigeria, c.1953
Great Britain and Northern Ireland, 1914-1934 - Revenue stamps of the United Kingdom
Guernsey, 1947-1971 - Revenue stamps of Guernsey
Ireland, 1960 - Revenue stamps of Ireland
Pakistan, 1991 - Revenue stamps of Pakistan
South Australia, 1936-c.1937 - Revenue stamps of South Australia
Syria, 1940s - Revenue stamps of Syria

Insolvency
Great Britain and Northern Ireland, 1971-c.1977 - Revenue stamps of the United Kingdom

Insurance

Bangladesh, c.1978-c.1990 - Revenue stamps of Bangladesh
Burma, 1937-1974 - Revenue stamps of Myanmar
Cape of Good Hope, 1879 - Revenue stamps of the Cape of Good Hope
Guernsey, 1935-1977 - Revenue stamps of Guernsey
India, 1921-c.1980 - Revenue stamps of India
including various states
Mauritius, 1869-1904
Myanmar, c.1989-c.2005 - Revenue stamps of Myanmar
Pakistan, 1947-c.2008 - Revenue stamps of Pakistan
Somalia, 1946-1947

Insurance Agent Licence Fee
India, c.1940 - Revenue stamps of India
Pakistan, c.1960 - Revenue stamps of Pakistan

Internal Revenue

Mauritius, 1869-1894
Western Australia, 1881-1899 - Revenue stamps of Western Australia

International Passenger Service
India, 1966-1977 - Revenue stamps of India

Jetty Tolls
South Australia, 1915-1931 - Revenue stamps of South Australia

Judicature
Great Britain and Northern Ireland, 1875-1960 - Revenue stamps of the United Kingdom
Ireland, 1878-1977 - Revenue stamps of Ireland
Southern Ireland, 1922 - Revenue stamps of Ireland

Judicial
British East Africa, 1897-1901 - Revenue stamps of Kenya
Ceylon, 1882-1906 - Revenue stamps of Sri Lanka
East Africa and Uganda, c.1903-c.1908
Federated Malay States, c.1900-c.1925 - Revenue stamps of Malaysia
Gold Coast, 1899-1907
Jamaica, 1898-1976 - Revenue stamps of Jamaica
Johore, 1904-1922 - Revenue stamps of the Malay States
Kenya, 1928-1930 - Revenue stamps of the Kenya
Negri Sembilan, c.1890-c.1900 - Revenue stamps of the Malay States
North Borneo, c.1916
Northern Ireland, 1921-1971 - Revenue stamps of the United Kingdom
Perak, c.1880-1899 - Revenue stamps of the Malay States
Selangor, 1897-1902 - Revenue stamps of the Malay States
Straits Settlements, 1868-c.1895 - Revenue stamps of Malaysia
Sudan, 1982-1995 - Revenue stamps of Sudan
Sungei Ujong, c.1893
Syria, 1954-2000s - Revenue stamps of Syria
Yemen, 1972 - Revenue stamps of Yemen

Judicial Court House
Syria, 1961-1990s - Revenue stamps of Syria

Juré-Justicier
Jersey, 1922-1982 - Revenue stamps of Jersey

Justice Court
Winchester, 1888 - Revenue stamps of the United Kingdom

Justice Fund
Manitoba, 1886-1892 - Revenue stamps of Canada

Justice Room
Great Britain and Northern Ireland, 1869-c.1960 - Revenue stamps of the United Kingdom

Land and Deeds
New Zealand, 1877-1879 - Revenue stamps of New Zealand

Land Charges
Hampshire, 1962-1965 - Revenue stamps of the United Kingdom

Land Commission
Great Britain and Ireland, 1884 - Revenue stamps of the United Kingdom
Northern Ireland, 1921 - Revenue stamps of the United Kingdom
Ireland, 1881-1971 - Revenue stamps of Ireland

Land Fees
Syria, 1949-1990s - Revenue stamps of Syria

Land Registry
Basel-City, Switzerland, 1948 - Revenue stamps of Basel
Great Britain and Northern Ireland, 1862-c.1983 - Revenue stamps of the United Kingdom
Ireland, 1906-1980 - Revenue stamps of Ireland
Northern Ireland, 1921-c.1974 - Revenue stamps of the United Kingdom
Southern Ireland, 1922 - Revenue stamps of Ireland

Land Titles Office
Manitoba, c.1985 - Revenue stamps of Canada
Morden, c.1985 - Revenue stamps of Canada
Winnipeg, c.1985 - Revenue stamps of Canada

Law Courts
Great Britain and Northern Ireland, 1873-1959 - Revenue stamps of the United Kingdom
New Zealand, 1875 - Revenue stamps of New Zealand
Scotland, 1971 - Revenue stamps of the United Kingdom

Law Library
Halifax, 1879-c.1998 - Revenue stamps of Canada

Law Society
Canada, 1864-1865 - Revenue stamps of Canada
Manitoba, 1877-1884 - Revenue stamps of Canada

Law Stamp
Alberta, 1906-1910 - Revenue stamps of Canada
British Columbia, 1879-1981 - Revenue stamps of Canada
Canada, 1876-c.1939 - Revenue stamps of Canada
Cape Breton, 1903-1997 - Revenue stamps of Canada
Lower Canada, 1864 - Revenue stamps of Canada
Manitoba, 1892-1896 - Revenue stamps of Canada
New Brunswick, 1884-1977 - Revenue stamps of Canada
Ontario, 1870-1940 - Revenue stamps of Canada
Quebec, 1871-c.1969 - Revenue stamps of Canada
Saskatchewan, 1907-1948 - Revenue stamps of Canada

Legacy Duty
Orange Free State, 1885 - Revenue stamps of South Africa

Legal Guardian Office
Bern-City, Switzerland, c.1930 - Revenue stamps of Bern

Licences
Quebec, 1889-1912 - Revenue stamps of Canada

Life Policy
Great Britain and Ireland, 1854-1872 - Revenue stamps of the United Kingdom

Livestock Export
Ireland, c.1940-1979 - Revenue stamps of Ireland

Local Government Tax
Bechuanaland, c.1965 - Revenue stamps of Bechuanaland
Botswana, c.1967-c.1976 - Revenue stamps of Bechuanaland

Luxury Tax
Great Britain and Ireland, 1918 (never actually issued) - Revenue stamps of the United Kingdom
Ontario, 1926

Magistrates' Courts
Great Britain and Northern Ireland, 1962 - Revenue stamps of the United Kingdom

Marine Policies
Straits Settlements, 1869 - Revenue stamps of Malaysia

Match Tax
Burma, c.1937 - Revenue stamps of Myanmar
Great Britain and Ireland, 1871 - Revenue stamps of the United Kingdom
India, c.1925-c.1970 - Revenue stamps of India

Matrimonial Cause

Great Britain and Ireland, 1858-1866 - Revenue stamps of the United Kingdom

Mayor's Court
Great Britain and Northern Ireland, 1883-1939 - Revenue stamps of the United Kingdom

Medical Fee
Libya, 1980s - Revenue stamps of Libya
United Arab Emirates, 1988-c.2000 - Revenue stamps of United Arab Emirates

Medicine Duty
British Guiana, c.1900 - Revenue stamps of British Guiana and Guyana
Canada, 1909-1919 - Revenue stamps of Canada
Great Britain and Northern Ireland, 1783-1941 - Revenue stamps of the United Kingdom
Sudan, 1969 - Revenue stamps of Sudan

Additional Medicine Duty
Great Britain and Ireland, 1915 - Revenue stamps of the United Kingdom

Metropolitan Police
Great Britain and Ireland, 1907-1921 - Revenue stamps of the United Kingdom

Military Tax
Syria, 1945-1970s - Revenue stamps of Syria

Mining Court
Dawson, 1903

Ministries
Kuwait, c.1985-1992

Money Order Tax
Newfoundland, 1914 - Revenue stamps of Canada

Monthly Pass Fee
South West Africa, 1949-1952 - Revenue stamps of South Africa

Mortgagee's Indemnity Fee
New Zealand, 1927-1947 - Revenue stamps of New Zealand

Motor Driver's Licence
Uganda, 1933-1936 - Revenue stamps of Uganda

Motor Transfer
Victoria, c.1937 - Revenue stamps of Victoria

Motor Vehicle Fitness Certificate
Baluchistan, 2010–present - Revenue stamps of Pakistan
Islamabad, 2010–present - Revenue stamps of Pakistan
Punjab, 2010–present - Revenue stamps of Pakistan
Sindh, 2000–present - Revenue stamps of Pakistan

Motor Vehicles Tax
Punjab, 1974-1977 - Revenue stamps of Pakistan
Sindh, 1972 - Revenue stamps of Pakistan
West Pakistan, 1970 - Revenue stamps of Pakistan

National Health Insurance
Great Britain and Ireland, 1912-1922 - Revenue stamps of the United Kingdom
Isle of Man, 1920 - Revenue stamps of the Isle of Man

National Insurance
Barbados, 1966-c.1977 - Revenue stamps of Barbados
Great Britain and Northern Ireland, 1948-1993 - Revenue stamps of the United Kingdom
Ireland, 1922-1976 - Revenue stamps of Ireland
Isle of Man, 1951-1974 - Revenue stamps of the Isle of Man
Jamaica, 1965 - Revenue stamps of Jamaica
Malta, 1956-1978 - Revenue stamps of Malta
Northern Ireland, 1951-1972 - Revenue stamps of the United Kingdom
Trinidad and Tobago, c.1960-c.1991 - Revenue stamps of Trinidad and Tobago

National Parks and Wildlife Services
Queensland, 1988 - Revenue stamps of Queensland

Native Tax
South Africa, 1942 - Revenue stamps of South Africa
South West Africa, 1942-c.1960 - Revenue stamps of South Africa

Naturalization
Great Britain and Ireland, 1870 - Revenue stamps of the United Kingdom

Notarial
Aden, c.1937-1940s - Revenue stamps of Aden
Bangladesh, 1977-1991 - Revenue stamps of Bangladesh
Burma, 1948-1974 - Revenue stamps of Myanmar
India, 1879-2010 - Revenue stamps of India
Myanmar, 1989-c.1997 - Revenue stamps of Myanmar
Pakistan, c.1992 - Revenue stamps of Pakistan
Syria, 1940-2000s - Revenue stamps of Syria

Official Arbitration
Ireland, 1922-1971 - Revenue stamps of Ireland
Northern Ireland, 1921 - Revenue stamps of the United Kingdom
Southern Ireland, 1921 - Revenue stamps of Ireland

Oil Cake Association
Liverpool, c.1880 - Revenue stamps of the United Kingdom

Old Age Pensions
Falkland Islands, 1952-1978 - Revenue stamps of Falkland Islands
Great Britain and Ireland, 1916 - Revenue stamps of the United Kingdom
Ireland - Revenue stamps of Ireland

Ottoman Public Debt Administration
Egyptian Expeditionary Force, 1918-1919

Palestine Tax
Syria, 1948-1954 - Revenue stamps of Syria

Papaw Levy
Queensland, 1936-1951 - Revenue stamps of Queensland

Paper Duty
Great Britain and Ireland, 1820-1856 - Revenue stamps of the United Kingdom

Pass
Transvaal, 1901-1902 - Revenue stamps of Transvaal

Passenger Service Charge
Malawi, c.1980-1988 - Revenue stamps of Nyasaland and Malawi
Nigeria, c.1983
Seychelles, c.1980

Passport

Bangladesh, 1972-c.1992 - Revenue stamps of Bangladesh
Great Britain and Northern Ireland, c.1910-c.1946 - Revenue stamps of the United Kingdom
India, c.1984 - Revenue stamps of India
Ireland, 1925-c.1940 - Revenue stamps of Ireland
Libya, 1988-2002 - Revenue stamps of Libya
Malta, 1933-1969 - Revenue stamps of Malta
New Zealand, 1926-1937 - Revenue stamps of New Zealand
Pakistan, c.1950 - Revenue stamps of Pakistan
Sudan, c.1927-c.1995 - Revenue stamps of Sudan
Yemen, c.1956 - Revenue stamps of Yemen

Patent
Australia, 1953-1978 - Revenue stamps of Australia
Great Britain and Ireland, 1853-1907 - Revenue stamps of the United Kingdom

Patent and Proprietary
Cape of Good Hope, 1909-1910 - Revenue stamps of the Cape of Good Hope

Paymaster General's Service
Great Britain and Ireland, 1890 - Revenue stamps of the United Kingdom

Pedlar's Certificate
Great Britain and Ireland, 1873-1879 - Revenue stamps of the United Kingdom

Penalty
Cape of Good Hope, 1911 - Revenue stamps of the Cape of Good Hope
Ciskei, c.1988 - Revenue stamps of South Africa
Cyprus, c.1960-1999 - Revenue stamps of Cyprus
New Zealand, 1875 - Revenue stamps of New Zealand
South Africa, 1913-2009 - Revenue stamps of South Africa
South West Africa, c.1923-1968 - Revenue stamps of South Africa
Transkei, c.1988 - Revenue stamps of South Africa
Transvaal, 1913 - Revenue stamps of Transvaal
Venda, c.1988 - Revenue stamps of South Africa
Victoria, c.1907 - Revenue stamps of Victoria

Perfume Duty
Great Britain, 1786 - Revenue stamps of the United Kingdom

Personal Tax
Southern Rhodesia, 1961-1964 - Revenue stamps of Rhodesia

Petition
India, 1866 - Revenue stamps of India

Petty Sessions
Ireland, 1858-1922 - Revenue stamps of Ireland
Northern Ireland, 1921-1971 - Revenue stamps of the United Kingdom
Southern Ireland, 1921 - Revenue stamps of Ireland

Pig Duty
Western Australia, 1943-1955 - Revenue stamps of Western Australia

Pineapple Levy
Queensland, 1936-1951 - Revenue stamps of Queensland

Playing Cards
Canada, 1947 - Revenue stamps of Canada

Police
Basel-City, Switzerland, 1860-1940s - Revenue stamps of Basel
Basel-Country, Switzerland, 1952 - Revenue stamps of Basel
Bern-City, Switzerland, 1908-1939 - Revenue stamps of Bern

Police Courts
Chatham and Sheerness c.1870-1875
Great Britain and Northern Ireland, 1875-1959 - Revenue stamps of the United Kingdom

Police, Frontier
Basel-City, Switzerland, 1917-1940s - Revenue stamps of Basel

Police Fund
Sudan, 1998 - Revenue stamps of Sudan

Poll Tax (Kodi)
Kenya, 1936-1959 - Revenue stamps of Kanya
Tanganyika, 1934-1962
Uganda, 1940-1952 - Revenue stamps of Uganda

Port Service Charge
Tanzania, 1990s

Post Office Savings Bank Receipt
Great Britain and Ireland, 1912-1920 - Revenue stamps of the United Kingdom

Postal Commission
Ceylon, 1890 - Revenue stamps of Sri Lanka

Postal Note / Postal Scrip
Canada, 1932-1967 - Revenue stamps of Canada
India, c.1870 - Revenue stamps of India

Postal Service
India, 1895-1904 - Revenue stamps of India

Poster Tax
Aargau, Switzerland, 1916 - Revenue stamps of Switzerland

Postal Surcharge
Cyprus, 1882-1883 - Revenue stamps of Cyprus

Power Commission
Saskatchewan, 1929-1947 - Revenue stamps of Canada
Saskatoon, 1911-1927 - Revenue stamps of Canada

Precise and Correct Taxes
Syria, 1960s - Revenue stamps of Syria

Prescription Charge
Great Britain and Northern Ireland, c.1960-c.1990 - Revenue stamps of the United Kingdom

Prohibition
Quebec, 1909 - Revenue stamps of Canada

Probate Duty
Great Britain and Ireland, 1858-1921 - Revenue stamps of the United Kingdom
New Brunswick, 1895-1977 - Revenue stamps of Canada
Western Australia, 1903-1922 - Revenue stamps of Western Australia

Producers Association
Queensland, 1924 - Revenue stamps of Queensland

Property Guarantee Fund
Jersey, 1915 - Revenue stamps of Jersey

Provision Association
Liverpool, c.1883 - Revenue stamps of the United Kingdom

Public Records
Great Britain and Northern Ireland, 1868-1960 - Revenue stamps of the United Kingdom
Ireland, 1922-1971 - Revenue stamps of Ireland

Public Records (Land Revenue Records and Inrolments)
Great Britain and Northern Ireland, 1904-c.1940 - Revenue stamps of the United Kingdom

Public Health Service
Basel-City, Switzerland, 1937-1942 - Revenue stamps of Basel

Racing Service Duty
Barbados, c.2000 - Revenue stamps of Barbados

Radio Licence
Bangladesh, 1981-1991 - Revenue stamps of Bangladesh
Singapore, 1971 - Revenue stamps of Singapore

Broadcasting Radio Licence Fee
India, 1965-1985 - Revenue stamps of India

Citizens' Band Radio Licence Fee
Great Britain and Northern Ireland, 1981-c.1990 - Revenue stamps of the United Kingdom

Railway Rates Tribunal
Great Britain and Ireland, 1922 - Revenue stamps of the United Kingdom

Receipt / Draft or Receipt
Ceylon, 1862-1872 - Revenue stamps of Sri Lanka
Great Britain and Ireland, 1853-1856 - Revenue stamps of the United Kingdom
Hong Kong, c.1946-1948 - Revenue stamps of Hong Kong
India, 1860-1861 - Revenue stamps of India
including various states
Sarawak, 1875-1885 - Revenue stamps of Sarawak
Straits Settlements, 1863-c.1880 - Revenue stamps of Malaysia
West Pakistan, 1947 - Revenue stamps of Pakistan

Record of Titles
Ireland, 1865-1882 - Revenue stamps of Ireland

Records
Ireland, 1893-1922 - Revenue stamps of Ireland

Refugee
India, 1971 - Revenue stamps of India
Pakistan, c.1950 - Revenue stamps of Pakistan
Transvaal, 1903 - Revenue stamps of Transvaal

Register House
Scotland, 1871-1959

Registers
Malta, 1925 - Revenue stamps of Malta

Registrar of Companies
New South Wales, 1961-1966 - Revenue stamps of New South Wales

Registrar's Office
Sudan, c.1990 - Revenue stamps of Sudan

Registration
Lower Canada, 1868 - Revenue stamps of Canada
Quebec, 1871-1971 - Revenue stamps of Canada

Registration of Deeds
Ireland, 1861-1971 - Revenue stamps of Ireland
Northern Ireland, 1949-1971 - Revenue stamps of the United Kingdom

Registration of Title
Ireland, 1890-1909 - Revenue stamps of Ireland

Registration of Title Insurance Fund
Ireland, 1890-1902 - Revenue stamps of Ireland

Registry Office
Basel-City, Switzerland, 1911-1958 - Revenue stamps of Basel

Relief Tax
New South Wales, c.1930 - Revenue stamps of New South Wales
Victoria, 1930 - Revenue stamps of Victoria

Rent Contract
Iraq, 1917 - Revenue stamps of Iraq

Revenue / Inland Revenue (inc. municipals)

Abu Dhabi, c.1969-c.1990
Aden, 1937-c.1940 - Revenue stamps of Aden
Alaouites, 1939-1943
Alderney, 1923-1939
Alexandretta, 1938-1939
Asmara, 1945-1952
Bahrain, 1924-1992
Bangladesh, 1973-2002 - Revenue stamps of Bangladesh
Barbados, 1916-1999 - Revenue stamps of Barbados
Basutoland, 1900-c.1967 - Revenue stamps of Basutoland and Lesotho
Batum, 1918
Bechuanaland, 1903-1961 - Revenue stamps of Bechuanaland
Bermuda, c.1936-1984 - Revenue stamps of Bermuda
Bophuthatswana, c.1988 - Revenue stamps of South Africa
Botswana, c.1968-1976 - Revenue stamps of Bechuanaland
British Bechuanaland, 1886-1887 - Revenue stamps of Bechuanaland
British Central Africa, 1891-1893
British East Africa, 1891-c.1898 - Revenue stamps of Kenya
British Guiana, 1869-c.1913
British Honduras, 1899
British Solomon Islands, c.1920-c.1968
British Somaliland, 1900
British South Africa Company (Rhodesia), 1890-c.1920
British Virgin Islands, 1988-2003
Burma, 1943 - Revenue stamps of Myanmar
Cape of Good Hope, 1864-1903 - Revenue stamps of the Cape of Good Hope
Cayman Islands, 1908-1980
Ceylon, 1938-1961 - Revenue stamps of Sri Lanka
Ciskei, c.1988
Cook Islands, 1921-1967
Crete, 1898
Kandia
Kenurio and Pyiotissa
Malevisi
Monofatsi
Pediada
Temenos
Cyprus, 1878-2008 - Revenue stamps of Cyprus
Cyrenaica, 1947-1963
Dominica, 1878-1887
Durban, 1957-c.1970 - Revenue stamps of South Africa
Eastern Nigeria, c.1956-c.1957
Egyptian Expeditionary Force, 1917-1918
Eritrea, 1943-1960 and 1991-1997
Federated Malay States, 1910-c.1939 - Revenue stamps of Malaysia
Fezzan, 1950s - Revenue stamps of Libya
German South West Africa, 1900-1904 - Revenue stamps of South Africa
Gloucestershire, 1870-1878 - Revenue stamps of the United Kingdom
Great Britain and Ireland, 1855-1959 - Revenue stamps of the United Kingdom
Grenada, 1875-1965
Griqualand West, 1877-1879 - Revenue stamps of South Africa
Guernsey, 1903-1961 - Revenue stamps of Guernsey
Guyana, 1975-c.2002 - Revenue stamps of British Guiana and Guyana
Haifa, c.1945
Hatay, 1938-1939
Hong Kong, c.1943-1945 - Revenue stamps of Hong Kong
India, 1869–present - Revenue stamps of India
including various states
Iraq, 1915-1932 - Revenue stamps of Iraq
Ireland, 1892-1923 - Revenue stamps of Ireland
Isle of Ely, 1870-1882 - Revenue stamps of the United Kingdom
Isle of Man, 1889-1976 - Revenue stamps of the Isle of Man
Italian East Africa, 1945-1948
Jamaica, 1855-c.1956 - Revenue stamps of Jamaica
Jebel Druze, 1939-1943
Jersey, 1900–present - Revenue stamps of Jersey
Jerusalem, c.1918
Johore, 1904-1950 - Revenue stamps of the Malay States
Kedah, 1929-1950 - Revenue stamps of the Malay States
Kelantan, 1937-1950 - Revenue stamps of the Malay States
Kenya, c.1954-2010 - Revenue stamps of Kenya
Kuwait, 1954-2012
Labuan, c.1905
Lagos, 1938
Lesotho, 1968-c.2006
Libya, c.1951-2009 - Revenue stamps of Libya
Malacca, 1950 - Revenue stamps of the Malay States
Malaya, 1942-c.1975 - Revenue stamps of the Malaysia
Malaysia, 1975-2009 - Revenue stamps of the Malayasia
Maldives, 1960-1981
Malta, 1899-1956 - Revenue stamps of Malta
Mauritius, 1889-1898
Mogadishu, c.2000
Montserrat, 1866-1887
Muscat and Oman, c.1930
Myanmar, 1991 - Revenue stamps of Myanmar
Namibia, 1990-2006
Natal, c.1855-1910 - Revenue stamps of South Africa
Negri Sembilan, c.1891-1950 - Revenue stamps of the Malay States
Nevis, 1877-1883
New Republic, 1886 - Revenue stamps of Transvaal
Newfoundland, 1898-1970 - Revenue stamps of Canada
Nigeria, 1916-1920 - Revenue stamps of Nigeria
North Borneo, 1886-c.1942
Northamptonshire, 1870-1882 - Revenue stamps of the United Kingdom
Northern Cyprus, 1962-1999 - Revenue stamps of Northern Cyprus
Northern Rhodesia, 1925-c.1955 - Revenue stamps of Northern Rhodesia
Nyasaland, c.1921-1955 - Revenue stamps of Nyasaland and Malawi
Oman, 1945-c.2000
Orange Free State (Orange River Colony), 1856-1907
Pahang, c.1890-1950 - Revenue stamps of the Malay States
Pakistan, 1947-c.1985 - Revenue stamps of Pakistan
Palestine, 1928 - Revenue stamps of Palestine
Penang, 1942-1949 - Revenue stamps of the Malay States
Perak, c.1888-1952 - Revenue stamps of the Malay States
Perlis, 1951 - Revenue stamps of the Malay States
Portuguese India, 1962 - Revenue stamps of India
Qatar, c.1961-1996
Rarotonga, 1921-1931
Rhodesia, 1966-1980 - Revenue stamps of Rhodesia
Rhodesia and Nyasaland, 1956
Saint Christopher, 1883-1884
Saint Kitts Nevis, 1884-1886
Saint Lucia, 1882-1884 and 1992
Saint Vincent, 1881-1894 and c.1984-2006
Sarawak, c.1889-1942 - Revenue stamps of Sarawak
Selangor, c.1880-1950 - Revenue stamps of Malay States
Seychelles, 1894-1922
Shan States, 1944
Sierra Leone, 1884
Singapore, 1948-c.1990 - Revenue stamps of Singapore
Somalia, 1943-1990s
South Africa, 1913-2009 - Revenue stamps of South Africa
South African Republic, 1875-c.1878 and 1886 - Revenue stamps of Transvaal
South West Africa, 1923-1970 - Revenue stamps of South Africa
Southern Rhodesia, 1924-1954 - Revenue stamps of Rhodesia
Southern Yemen, 1969 - Revenue stamps of Yemen
Sri Lanka, 1979-2002 - Revenue stamps of Sri Lanka
Stellaland, 1884-1886 - Revenue stamps of Bechuanaland
Straits Settlements, 1874-1938 - Revenue stamps of Malaysia
Sudan, 1962-c.1998 - Revenue stamps of Sudan
Sungei Ujong, c.1880-c.1890 - Revenue stamps of the Malay States
Swaziland, 1890-c.2007
Syburi, 1944 - Revenue stamps of the Malay States
Syria, 1938-2007 - Revenue stamps of Syria
Tati Concessions Limited, 1896 - Revenue stamps of Bechuanaland
Tel Aviv, c.1935-1944
Tobago, 1879-1890 - Revenue stamps of Trinidad and Tobago
Transjordan, 1920-c.1942
Transkei, c.1988 - Revenue stamps of South Africa
Transvaal, 1877-1884 and 1900-1906 - Revenue stamps of Transvaal
Trengganu, 1942-1950 - Revenue stamps of the Malay States
Trinidad and Tobago, 1908-1964 - Revenue stamps of Trinidad and Tobago
Tripoli, c.1945-1963
Tripolitania, 1945-1959 - Revenue stamps of Libya
Uganda, c.1898-c.1970 - Revenue stamps of Uganda
United Arab Emirates, c.1973-1992 - Revenue stamps of the United Arab Emirates
Venda, c.1988 - Revenue stamps of South Africa
Weihaiwei, 1921-c.1926 - Revenue stamps of Weihaiwei
Western Australia, 1941-1973 - Revenue stamps of Western Australia
Yemen (Arab Republic), 1971-1983 - Revenue stamps of Yemen
Yemen (People's Democratic Republic), 1970s-c.1980 - Revenue stamps of Yemen
Zambia, 1964-1968 - Revenue stamps of Rhodesia
Zanzibar, 1892-1970 - Revenue stamps of Zanzibar
Zimbabwe, 1981-c.2009 - Revenue stamps of Zimbabwe
Zululand, 1888-1892 - Revenue stamps of Rhodesia

Route Permit
Punjab, 1997–present - Revenue stamps of Pakistan
Sindh, 1981–present - Revenue stamps of Pakistan

Sales Tax
Guernsey, 1940-1946 - Revenue stamps of Guernsey
Somalia, 1960s

Sea Departure Fee
Yemen, 1971 - Revenue stamps of Yemen
Zanzibar, c.1993 - Revenue stamps of Zanzibar

Search Fee
Manitoba, 1920-c.1990 - Revenue stamps of Canada

Secretariat Fees
Mogadishu, 1952

Share Transfer
Bangladesh, 1978-c.1982 - Revenue stamps of Bangladesh
Burma, 1937-1953 - Revenue stamps of Myanmar
India, 1863-1975 - Revenue stamps of India
including various states
Pakistan, c.1947-c.1995 - Revenue stamps of Pakistan

Small Cause Court

India, 1868 - Revenue stamps of India
Calcutta, 1868-1964 - Revenue stamps of India
Madras, 1869-1872 - Revenue stamps of India

Social Assurance / Social Insurance / Social Security
Cyprus, 1956-c.1970 - Revenue stamps of Cyprus
Falkland Islands, 1953-1962
Gibraltar, c.1971-1976 - Revenue stamps of Gibraltar
India, 1952-c.1973 - Revenue stamps of India
Jamaica, 1976-c.2000 - Revenue stamps of Jamaica
Jersey, 1936-c.1975 - Revenue stamps of Jersey
Malaysia, 1971-1973 - Revenue stamps of Malaysia
New Zealand, 1939-1958 - Revenue stamps of New Zealand
Northern Cyprus, 1970-2001 - Revenue stamps of Northern Cyprus
Somalia, c.1943-1949
Sudan, 1975-1979 - Revenue stamps of Sudan

Special Adhesive

Bangladesh, 1973-1987 - Revenue stamps of Bangladesh
Burma, 1937-c.1980 - Revenue stamps of Myanmar
India, 1866-c.1975 - Revenue stamps of India
including various states
Myanmar, c.1997-2007 - Revenue stamps of Myanmar
Pakistan, 1947-2003 - Revenue stamps of Pakistan

Stamp Duty

Antigua, 1870-1876 - Revenue stamps of Antigua
Australian Capital Territory, 1966-1983 - Revenue stamps of the Australian Capital Territory
Ceylon, 1872-1905 - Revenue stamps of Sri Lanka
Fiji, 1871-1922
Gibraltar, 1884-1898 - Revenue stamps of Gibraltar
Hong Kong, 1867-c.1990 - Revenue stamps of Hong Kong
New Guinea, 1928-c.1935
New South Wales, 1865-1998 - Revenue stamps of New South Wales
New Zealand, 1866-1986 - Revenue stamps of New Zealand
Niuafo'ou, c.1986-c.1990
Niue, 1918-1967
Northern Territory (North Australia), 1917-c.1990 - Revenue stamps of the Northern Territory
Papua, 1907-1949
Papua New Guinea, 1949-c.2000
Queensland, 1866-1901 - Revenue stamps of Queensland
Saint Lucia, 1881
Saint Vincent, 1980
Samoa, 1914-1931 and 1967-c.1973
Sierra Leone, 1886-1894
South Australia, 1902-2003 - Revenue stamps of South Australia
Tanganyika, 1950-c.2000
Tasmania, 1863-1970 - Revenue stamps of Tasmania
Tokelau, 1966-1967
Tonga, 1995-1998
Victoria, 1879-1981 - Revenue stamps of Victoria
Western Australia, 1904-1930 - Revenue stamps of Western Australia
Western Samoa, 1935-1955
Yemen, 1940s-1995 - Revenue stamps of Yemen

Adhesive Stamp Duty
Queensland, 1918-c.1980 - Revenue stamps of Queensland

Duty Paid in Full
New Zealand, c.1868 - Revenue stamps of New Zealand

Impressed Stamp Duty
Queensland, 1895-1966 - Revenue stamps of Queensland

Not Liable
New Zealand, 1875-1931 - Revenue stamps of New Zealand

Stamp Duty Duly Stamped
Victoria, c.1889-c.1905 - Revenue stamps of Victoria

Stamp Duty Exempt
Victoria, c.1897-c.1915 - Revenue stamps of Victoria

Stamp Duty Reimbursement Fees
Mogadishu, 1952

Stamp Statute
Victoria, 1870-1882 - Revenue stamps of Victoria

State Service
Ireland, 1925-1971 - Revenue stamps of Ireland

Stocks, Shares and Bonds

Basel-City, Switzerland, 1883 - Revenue stamps of Basel
Malta, 1925 - Revenue stamps of Malta

Student Accident Insurance
Basel-City, Switzerland, 1922-1956 - Revenue stamps of Basel

Summary Jurisdiction
British Guiana, 1865-1887 - Revenue stamps of Australia

Supreme Court
Samoa, c.1920
Western Australia, 1903-1922 - Revenue stamps of Western Australia

Swine
New South Wales, 1928-1966 - Revenue stamps of New South Wales
Queensland, 1962-c.1969 - Revenue stamps of Queensland
South Australia, 1937-c.1985 - Revenue stamps of South Australia
Victoria, 1928-1966 - Revenue stamps of Victoria

Table Water Duty
Great Britain and Ireland, 1916 - Revenue stamps of the United Kingdom

Tax Instalment
Australia, 1944-1990 - Revenue stamps of Australia
New South Wales, 1941-1944 - Revenue stamps of New South Wales
Northern Territory, 1941 - Revenue stamps of Northern Territory
Queensland, 1941-1944 - Revenue stamps of Queensland
South Australia, 1941-1944 - Revenue stamps of South Australia
Tasmania, 1940-1944 - Revenue stamps of Tasmania
Victoria, 1933-1944 - Revenue stamps of Victoria
Western Australia, 1940-1944 - Revenue stamps of Western Australia

Tea Clearing House
Great Britain and Northern Ireland, 1923-c.1958 - Revenue stamps of the United Kingdom

Television Licence
Great Britain and Northern Ireland, 1972-1997 - Revenue stamps of the United Kingdom
Singapore, 1969-1988 - Revenue stamps of Singapore

Territorial Court
Yukon, 1903-1951 - Revenue stamps of Canada

Tobacco Duty Relief
Great Britain and Northern Ireland, 1947-1958 - Revenue stamps of the United Kingdom

Tobacco Tax
New Brunswick, 1940-1941 - Revenue stamps of Canada
North Borneo, 1943
Prince Edward Island, 1942 - Revenue stamps of Canada
South West Africa, 1925-1937 - Revenue stamps of South Africa
Sudan, 1960 - Revenue stamps of Sudan

Tomato Levy
Queensland, 1939-1951 - Revenue stamps of Queensland

Tourism

Basel-City, Switzerland, 1942-1956 - Revenue stamps of Basel

Town Hall
Sheffield, 1891 - Revenue stamps of the United Kingdom

Trade Development Board
Singapore, 1983 - Revenue stamps of Singapore

Trade Mark
Great Britain and Ireland, 1907 - Revenue stamps of the United Kingdom

Transfer Duty 
Great Britain and Ireland, 1888-1893 - Revenue stamps of the United Kingdom
Ontario, 1910-1969 - Revenue stamps of Canada
Quebec, 1907-1913 - Revenue stamps of Canada

Traffic Offence Fine
Bangladesh, 1990-2002 - Revenue stamps of Bangladesh

Transport Tribunal
Great Britain and Northern Ireland, 1947-1959 - Revenue stamps of the United Kingdom

Transportation Tax
Newfoundland, 1927 - Revenue stamps of Canada
Punjab, c.1980 - Revenue stamps of Pakistan

Travel Identity Card
Great Britain and Northern Ireland, 1948-1949 - Revenue stamps of the United Kingdom

Travel Permit

Great Britain and Northern Ireland, 1939-1945 - Revenue stamps of the United Kingdom
Turkey, 1890 - Revenue stamps of Turkey

Tribal Tax
South West Africa - Revenue stamps of South Africa
Basubia, 1931
Gobobia
Grootfontain
Mafuri (Bayai), 1931
Okavango, c.1940-1949
Omaruru
Ombalantu, c.1920-1953
Ondonga, 1931-c.1961
Ongandjera, 1931-1953
Otjiwarongo
Ovambo, 1931-1953
Ovambo-kushu, 1931
Ukualuthi, 1931-c.1940
Ukuambi, c.1920-1953
Ukuanyama, c.1920-1949

Unemployment Insurance
Basel-Country, Switzerland, 1933 - Revenue stamps of Basel
Canada, 1941-1968 - Revenue stamps of Canada
Great Britain and Northern Ireland, 1912-1948 - Revenue stamps of the United Kingdom
Ireland, 1922-c.1977 - Revenue stamps of Ireland
Quebec, 1934 - Revenue stamps of Canada
Queensland, 1923-1945 - Revenue stamps of Queensland

Agriculture Unemployment Insurance
Great Britain and Northern Ireland, 1936 - Revenue stamps of the United Kingdom

Unemployment Relief
New South Wales, 1939-1941 - Revenue stamps of New South Wales
New Zealand, 1931-1936 - Revenue stamps of New Zealand
Queensland, 1930-1933 - Revenue stamps of Queensland

Vacation Pay
Manitoba, c.1955-c.1960 - Revenue stamps of Canada
New Brunswick, 1958 - Revenue stamps of Canada
Nova Scotia, 1958 - Revenue stamps of Canada
Ontario, c.1955 - Revenue stamps of Canada
Quebec, 1958-c.1959 - Revenue stamps of Canada

Vakil
India, c.1875-c.1920 - Revenue stamps of India

Value Added Tax
Channel Islands, 1973 - Revenue stamps of Guernsey - Revenue stamps of Jersey

Vegetable Levy
Queensland, 1946-1951 - Revenue stamps of Queensland

Vehicle Licence
Bangladesh, 1977-1980 - Revenue stamps of Bangladesh
Great Britain and Northern Ireland, 1980-1985 - Revenue stamps of the United Kingdom

Vehicle Permit
Bangladesh, 1977-1992 - Revenue stamps of Bangladesh

Vehicle Registration
India, c.1995 - Revenue stamps of India

Vehicle Tax
Bangladesh, 1977-1991 - Revenue stamps of Bangladesh

Vehicle Test Fee
Bangladesh, 1982-1991 - Revenue stamps of Bangladesh

Vehicle Transport
Bangladesh, 1990 - Revenue stamps of Bangladesh

Wages Tax
New South Wales, 1933-1939 - Revenue stamps of New South Wales
Tasmania, 1935-1937 - Revenue stamps of Tasmania

War Tax

Bahrain, c.1967-1973 - Revenue stamps of Bahrain
Basel-City, Switzerland, 1941 - Revenue stamps of Basel
Canada, 1915 - Revenue stamps of Canada
Libya, 1970-1984 - Revenue stamps of Libya

Warehouse Warrant
Ceylon, 1871-1906 - Revenue stamps of Sri Lanka

Weights and Measures
Canada, 1867-1930 - Revenue stamps of Canada

Welfare
Pakistan, c.1972 - Revenue stamps of Pakistan

West Riding Registry
Great Britain and Ireland, 1907 - Revenue stamps of the United Kingdom

Wet Time (Unemployment Insurance)

Ireland - Revenue stamps of Ireland

Workmen's Compensation
Guernsey, 1925 - Revenue stamps of Guernsey
Malta, 1929-1956 - Revenue stamps of Malta

References

Revenue stamps